Machar may refer to:

People:
 Agnes Maule Machar (1837–1927), Canadian author
 Josef Svatopluk Machar (1854–1942), Czech poet and essayist
 Riek Machar (b. 1952), Vice President of Southern Sudan
 Saint Machar, a purported 6th century Gaelic saint

Places:
 Machar Colony, a neighborhood in Kiamari Town, Pakistan
 Machar, Ontario, a township in Canada
 the Machars, a peninsula in southwest Scotland

Other uses:
 Machar, The Washington Congregation for Secular Humanistic Judaism, a congregation in the Washington, DC metro area
 Machair (geography), a type of fertile low-lying raised beach
 Machar, a transliteration of the Hebrew word meaning "tomorrow"
 St Machar's Cathedral in Aberdeen, Scotland
 Machar Oilfield, a part of the Eastern Trough Area Project in the North Sea
 Macchar, Hindi and Urdu for mosquito
 an Anglicisation of Machair